Super Roots 5 is the fourth installment in the Super Roots EP series by noise rock band Boredoms, released in 1995 by Warner Music Japan.

There was never a Super Roots 4 released due to some sort of conflict with a record label (rather than the popularly cited superstition about the number in Japanese culture).

Track listing

References

Boredoms EPs
1995 EPs